Karen Kingsbury (born June 8, 1963) is an American Christian novelist born in Fairfax, Virginia.

She was a sports writer for the Los Angeles Times and later wrote for the Los Angeles Daily News. Her first book, Missy's Murder (1991), was based on a murder story that she covered in Los Angeles. During this time, she had an article published in People Magazine.

She has written or co-written almost 100 novels or short stories, and (as of 2008) has nearly 13 million copies of her novels in print. She is a #1 New York Times and USA Today best selling novelist with the last dozen books published topping bestseller lists. Some of her novels are being developed into movies by The Hallmark Channel,  including The Bridge, A Time to Dance (2015), and Maggie's Christmas Miracle (2017). Her Baxter Family series is being adapted into a television series. Lightworkers Media and Roma Downey have the rights to develop the series.

Kingsbury also does public speaking, and through national events she reaches more than 100,000 people each year.

Personal life 
Karen Kingsbury is the oldest of five children born to Ted and Anne Kingsbury. Her family moved around a lot because of her father's job with IBM; ultimately the family would finally settle down in the San Fernando Valley (relocating from Michigan) when Karen was ten.

She graduated with a degree in journalism from California State University Northridge in 1986. After she graduated she worked for the Los Angeles Times as a sports writer and also reported on the crime beat. She lost on the September 4, 1985 episode of the $25,000 Pyramid

She married her husband, Don Russell, on July 23, 1989. They have three children and later adopted three boys from Haiti.

In conjunction with Kingsbury, Liberty University announced in November 2017 the opening of the Karen Kingsbury Center for Creative Writing as part of its College of Arts and Sciences, where students can obtain a minor in Creative Writing.  Kingsbury herself will teach several of the courses, both in residence at Liberty and online.

Karen Kingsbury's father died due to complications from diabetes. She chose to start eating healthier and to cut out sugar and as a result lost 70 pounds between January and November in 2007.

Books 
(*) denotes a book that is not yet released (if known the release date is shown).

Series involving the Baxter Family
These sets of series is by far her most popular, and comprise nearly a quarter of her work.  The Baxters are either the main characters, or play key roles, in each of the books.  The series is set mainly in and around Bloomington, Indiana (where the Baxters grew up and some of them still live in the series).

Redemption series (with Gary Smalley)
 Redemption (2002)
 Remember (2003)
 Return (2003)
 Rejoice (2004)
 Reunion (2004)

Firstborn series
 Fame (2005)
 Forgiven (2005)
 Found (2006)
 Family (2006)
 Forever 2000)

Sunrise series
 Sunrise (2007)
 Summer (2007)
 Someday (2008)
 Sunset (2008)

Above the Line series
 Take One (2009)
 Take Two (2009)
 Take Three (2010)
 Take Four (2010)

Bailey Flanigan series
 Leaving (2011)
 Learning (2011)
 Longing (2011)
 Loving (2012)

Coming Home, The Baxter Family (a standalone work originally planned to end the series)
 Coming Home (2012)

Baxter Family Collection
 A Baxter Family Christmas (2016)
 Love Story (2017)
 In This Moment (2017)
 To the Moon and Back (2018)
 When We Were Young (2018)
 Two Weeks (2019)
 Someone Like You (2020)
 Truly, Madly, Deeply (2020)

Baxter Family Children series (with Tyler Russell, for ages 8-12)
 Best Family Ever (2019)
 Finding Home (to be released February 25, 2020)

Other series

Angels Walking series
 Angels Walking (2014)
 Chasing Sunsets (2015)
 Brush of Wings (2016)
 Always and Forever (*)

Heart of the Story Series
 The Family of Jesus (2014)
 The Friends of Jesus (2015)
 The Followers of Jesus (*)
 First Hand Encounters of Jesus (*)

9/11 Series
 One Tuesday Morning (2003)
 Beyond Tuesday Morning (2004)
 Remember Tuesday Morning (2008)

Lost Love series
 Even Now (2005)
 Ever After (2006)

Red Gloves series
 Gideon's Gift (2002)
 Maggie's Miracle (2003)
 Sarah's Song (2004)
 Hannah's Hope (2005)

Forever Faithful series
 Waiting for Morning (1999)
 A Moment of Weakness (2000)
 Halfway to Forever (2002)

Timeless Love series
 A Time to Dance (2001)
 A Time to Embrace (2002)

Cody Gunner series
 A Thousand Tomorrows (2005)
 Just Beyond the Clouds (2007)

Treasury of Miracles Books
 A Treasury of Christmas Miracles (2001)
 A Treasury of Miracles for Women (2002)
 A Treasury of Miracles for Teens (2003)
 A Treasury of Miracles for Friends (2004)
 A Treasury of Adoption Miracles (2005)
 Miracles - A 52 Week Devotional (2009)

Other works

True crime
 Missy's Murder (1991)
 Final Vows (1992)
 Deadly Pretender: The Double Life of David Miller (1993)
 The Snake and the Spider (1995)
These four books were Kingsbury's first novels.  They were re-released in 2014 and included a letter from Kingsbury to her readers, explaining how writing these types of stories became too much for her to handle emotionally due to the darkness associated with them, and thus she changed genres to writing more general fiction with a Christian emphasis (which she titled, and has trademarked, as "Life-Changing Fiction").

Standalone novels

 On Every Side (2001)
 Oceans Apart (2004)
 Divine (2006)
 Like Dandelion Dust (2006)
 When Joy Came to Stay (2000)
 Where Yesterday Lives (2006)
 Between Sundays (2007)
 Shades of Blue (2008)
 This Side of Heaven (2009)
 Unlocked (2010)
 The Bridge (2012) 
 The Chance (2013)
 Fifteen Minutes (2013)
 A Distant Shore (2021)

Children's books
 Let Me Hold You Longer (2004)
 Let's Go On a Mommy Date (2008)
 We Believe In Christmas (2008)
 The Princess and the Three Knights (2009)
 Let's Have a Daddy Day (2010)
 The Brave Young Knight (2011)
 Far Flutterby (2012)
 Always Daddy's Princess (2013)
 Go Ahead and Dream (with Alex Smith) (2013)
 Whatever You Grow Up To Be (2014)

Gift books
 Forever Young (with Pat Williams) (2005)
 Be Safe Little Boy (2006)
 Stay Close Little Girl (2006)
 Forever My Little Boy (2016)
 Forever My Little Girl (2016)

E-shorts
 The Beginning (prequel to The Bridge) (2012) 
 I Can Only Imagine (2013)
 Elizabeth Baxter's 10 Secrets to a Happy Marriage (2015)
 Once Upon A Campus (2016, expanded 2018)

 Music 
Karen Kingsbury co-wrote her first song, "Walls" with Gary Baker and Richie McDonald; it appeared on McDonald's inspirational album, I Turn to You and hit Christian and Country radio in January 2009.

She wrote the song, "Tell Me to Breathe", that was included on the album I Can Do This by Marie Osmond.

Kingsbury also wrote "Miracles Happen", a Christmas song sung by country musician Richie McDonald, which now appears on McDonald's CD, If Every Day Could Be Christmas''.

Filmography

References

External links
 
 Gideon's Gift Movie
 Between Sundays review
 Karen Kingsbury on IMDb

1963 births
Living people
American women novelists
Christian novelists
Writers from Vancouver, Washington
American women journalists
American sports journalists
American non-fiction crime writers
21st-century American novelists
20th-century American novelists
20th-century American women writers
21st-century American women writers
Women crime writers
Los Angeles Times people
American women songwriters
Songwriters from Virginia
Songwriters from Washington (state)
Novelists from Washington (state)
21st-century American non-fiction writers